The 1928–29 Ottawa Senators season was the club's 12th season in the NHL, 44th overall. The Senators' financial troubles continued, as the team sold Punch Broadbent to the New York Americans. There were numerous rumours that the team was going to be sold to a group from Chicago: Senators owner Frank Ahearn denied this, but admitted that the team was for sale to the highest bidder. Once again, for the second straight year, the Senators would play two "home" games in Detroit due to poor fan support when US-based teams would play games in Ottawa.

Regular season
On the ice, the Senators struggled to score goals, scoring only 54, the fourth fewest in the league.  Frank Finnigan scored 15 of them to lead the team, and finish with a club high of 19 points. New captain King Clancy scored 13 goals to lead the defense. Midway through the season, the Sens traded longtime player Buck Boucher to the Montreal Maroons in exchange for youngster Joe Lamb.

Alec Connell was steady in the Senators' net, winning 14 games, and having a GAA of 1.43, along with seven shutouts.

The Senators failed to qualify for the playoffs for the first time since 1925, as they finished in fourth place in the five-team Canadian Division.

Final standings

Record vs. opponents

Schedule and results

D – played in Detroit.

Transactions
The Senators were involved in the following transactions during the 1928–29 season.

Trades

Player statistics

Regular season
Scoring

Goaltending

Playoffs
The Senators did not qualify for the playoffs.

References

 National Hockey League Guide & Record Book 2007

Ottawa Senators (original) seasons
Ottawa
Ottawa